Vandalia-Teutonia Berlin is a German Student Corps (Fraternity) in the Kösener SC-Verband (KSCV), the umbrella organization of the oldest German fraternities. As a corps, Vandalia-Teutonia practices academic fencing and wears Colours. Its membership comprises active and former students and alumni of all Berlin universities. Its members are called Vandalen-Teutonen.

Like all corps, Vandalia-Teutonia practices tolerance in political, scientific and religious affairs.

Basic Principles
The corps' basic principles are set in the corps constitution. They are honor, loyalty, comradeship, patriotism, tolerance and sense of responsibility.

Members also have to preserve good social graces and a respectful attitude towards women and senior people.

Notable members
 Otto Roquette (1824–96), German poet
  (1864–1936), German author
 Werner Dankwort (1895–1986), German U.N. ambassador

See also
 Corps
 Kösener Senioren-Convents-Verband
 Studentenverbindung

External links
 Corps Vandalia-Teutonia Berlin (in german)

Corps Vandalia-Teutonia Berlin
Non-profit organisations based in Berlin
1851 establishments in Prussia
1851 establishments in Germany
Student organizations established in 1851
Humboldt University of Berlin alumni
Free University of Berlin alumni
Technical University of Berlin alumni